TVS One Make Championship is an annual motorcycling event conducted by TVS Motor Company. The championship is conducted in five rounds organized at Madras Motor Race Track, Kari Motor Speedway and Buddh International Circuit. The One Make Championship is approved by the Federation of Motor Sports Clubs of India (FMSCI).
 
The championship consists of two categories – Open and Novice. Both these categories include two races on racing tuned 4-stroke TVS Apache RTR 200 bikes. For the novice category, there are two criteria; 1. The riders should be of below the age of 23 years on the date of race 2. They should not have won any of the previous championships or races conducted anywhere in the world. For the open category, the age of the riders should be above 23 years and they must hold a winning title in any professional race or championship. Each rider is also required to possess a valid competition license issued by FMSCI.
 
The bike used for the championship, the TVS Apache RTR 200 is nowhere close to the street legal version of the same. The lightweight half-faired bodywork, committed ergonomics and bare bones appeal of the motorcycle gives it a true race bike stance. The engine, suspension, brakes, wheels and frame though have been lifted off from the road legal bike, but they too have been heavily tuned up for squeezing out the maximum speed and acceleration of the motorcycle.

References

Motorcycle road racing series